James Woodburn (21 April 1870 – 1 May 1903) was a Scotland international rugby union player. He played at Three-Quarters

Rugby Union career

Amateur career

Woodburn played for Kelvinside Academicals.

Provincial career

Woodburn played for Glasgow District against Edinburgh District in the 17 December 1892 Inter-City match. This was in the middle of an unbeaten spell in the Inter-City for Glasgow; and Glasgow District won the match by 1 goal & 1 try to 3 tries (in an era when goals were predominate over tries).

International career

Woodburn played one match for Scotland. This was the Home Nations match against Ireland at Raeburn Place, Edinburgh on 20 February 1892. Scotland won the match 2 - 0.

References

1870 births
1903 deaths
Scottish rugby union players
Scotland international rugby union players
Rugby union three-quarters
Kelvinside Academicals RFC players
Glasgow District (rugby union) players
Rugby union players from Glasgow